Bharat Bhushan Goswami (born 1955) is an Indian sarangi player.

Early life
Goswami was born in 1955 in Brindaban. He is one of the few sarangi players, which are not from a musical family. He first learned devotional music from his grandfather Amolchandra Goswami.

Career
Goswami learned sarangi first from Kanhaiyalal Mishra of Varanasi. He continued then under the renowned sarangi player Hanuman Prasad Mishra. He has accompanied many vocalists and has performed on many festivals such as Sarangi Mahotsav and Tansen Samaroh.

References

1955 births
Living people
Sarangi players
Indian classical musicians